Shelly or Shelli may refer to:

Places 
 Shelly, Minnesota, a small city in the United States
 Shelly, Richland Township, Bucks County, Pennsylvania, United States
 Shelly Township, Norman County, Minnesota
 Shelly Park, a suburb in Auckland, New Zealand
 Shelly Bay, a bay in New Zealand
 Shelly Beach (disambiguation)
 Şelli (or Shelly/Shelli), village in Azerbaijan

People
 Shelly (model) (born 1984), Japanese model and television presenter
 Shelly Bereznyak (born 2000), Israeli tennis player
 Shelly Bond (née Roeberg), American comic book editor
 Shelly Bradley (born Shelly Banks, 1970), Canadian curler
 Shelly Burch (born 1960), American actress and singer
 Shelly Dadon (died 2014), Israeli murder victim
 Shelly Fairchild (born 1977), American music recording artist
 Shelly Finkel (born 1944), American boxing and music manager and promoter
 Shelly Hutchinson, American politician
 Shelly Johnson (Twin Peaks), character from the television show Twin Peaks
 Shelly Kappe (born 1928), American architectural historian
 Shelly Kishore (born 1983), Indian actress
 Shelly Lundberg, American economist
 Shelly Manne (1920–1984), American jazz drummer
 Shelly Martinez (born 1980), American model, actress, retired professional wrestler and valet
 Shelly Miscavige (born 1961), leader in the Church of Scientology
 Shelly Palmer, American advertising, marketing and technology consultant
 Shelly Poole (born 1972), English songwriter and singer
 Shelly Peiken, American songwriter
 Shelly Peyton, American chemist
 Shelly Saltman (1931–2019), American event promoter
 Shelly Steely Ramirez, American long-distance runner
 Shelly West (born 1958), American country music singer
 Shelly Willingham (born 1943), American politician
 Shelly Woods (born 1986), British Paralympic athlete
 Shelly Yachimovich (born 1960), Israeli politician

Fictional characters
 Shelly LaMarine, a character from the 1976 Hanna-Barbera series Jabberjaw
 Shelly Sultenfuss, a character 1991 and 1994 American coming-of-age comedy-drama movies My Girl and My Girl 2
 Shelly, a character from the video game Brawl Stars
 Shelly, a character from the video game Yo-kai Watch (originally named Shiori Nakamura)

Surname 
Adrienne Shelly (1966–2006), American actress, director, and screenwriter
Ben Shelly (born 1947), a president of the Navajo Nation
Pat Shelly, American breastfeeding activist
Rubel Shelly, author, minister, and former president of Rochester College
Tony Shelly (1937–1998), racing driver from New Zealand

Other 
 MV Shelly, a cargo vessel that sank after a 2007 collision with the Salamis Glory
 Shelly Party (מפלגת שלי), a minor political party in Israel 
 Shelly limestone
 17280 Shelly, a main-belt asteroid

See also 
 Shelley (disambiguation)
 Michelle (name)
 Keep Shelly in Athens, a Greek musical duo